Season 2015–16 is the 16th of Veria in Super League Greece. Veria will compete in the following competitions Super League and Greek Cup. The season covers the period from 1 July 2015 to 30 June 2016.

Players

Squad information

Out on loan

Transfers

Summer Transfers

In:

Out:

.

Winter Transfers

In:

Out:

Technical and medical staff

Veria Academy

Season Milestones
On 20 May 2015, Super League's court found Veria innocent as she was accused for fixing the game against Olympiacos F.C. in 2013.
On 21 May 2015, Cyril Kali expanded his contract with the club for two more years while Branko Ostojić expanded his contract until 31 June 2016.
On 25 May 2015, Pedro Arce signed a one-year contract expansion.
On 26 May 2015, Javier Campora and Jose Catala mutually terminated their contracts with the club.
On 29 May 2015, Sotiris Balafas signed his new contract which is set to expire on 31 June 2017.
On 2 June 2015, Alexandros Vergonis renewed his contract with the club until 31 June 2016.
On 18 June 2015, Veria F.C. board announced a major upgrade of their training facilities in Tagarochori.
Veria's pre-season preparation will take place at Golden Tulip, in Arnhem, Netherlands.
Veria's first training of the season took place on 6 June 2015 at Tagarochori Training Center.
On 8 July 2015 Veria was judged as innocent for the suspected fixed match against Olympiacos, on 6 January 2013, by the appeal committee of Hellenic Football Federation and they will remain in Super League for fourth consecutive year, a record for the club as they never before survived for more than three seasons at the top tier of Greek football.
On 3 August 2015 Levadiakos' appeal at Referee's Football Court of Hellenic Football Federation was turned down and Veria permanently secured her position in the Super League.
On 30 August 2015, Theodoros Karipidis confirmed the interest of a Chinese group of businessmen to buy club's partly or whole shares package. They arranged an appointment in Milan, Italy which will take place on 2 September 2015.
On 31 August 2015, Stefanos Dogos was released on a free transfer by the club while Dimitris Manos was given on loan to Ergotelis in Football League.
On 2 September 2015, Asterios Merkousis who was a young goalkeeper of Veria U20 youth squad that the club was expecting a lot to come from his talent, during the evening training of the same day with the first team squad died as he suffered from a heart attack. An ambulance brought him to Veria's hospital but doctors didn't make it to keep him alive.
On 19 January 2016, Georgios Georgiadis was fired by the club after several disappointing results.
Dimitrios Eleftheropoulos was appointed as Veria's new manager on 26 January 2016. His assistant will be Stylianos Venetidis.
Veria finished 14th in the Super League Greece championship, securing a position for the next season.

Fixtures & Results

Overall

Last updated: 17 April 2016Source: Competitions

Pre-season Friendlies

Friendlies

Fixtures

Last updated: 17 April 2016Source: Superleague Greece
1. Matches of Matchday 4 originally were scheduled to be held in 19/20/21 September 2015, but due to the Elections to be held on 20 September 2015 Superleague Greece, decided the Matchday 4 to be held 22/23 September 2015.

Tickets
Updated to games played on 28 September 2015, as published on superleaguegreece.net. Games are counted without games played behind closed gates.

League table

Results summary

Results by matchday

Greek Cup

Second round

Third round

Last updated: 19 December 2015Source: HFF

Players Statistics

Overall

Updated as of 25 January 2016, 13:12 UTC. 

Source: Superleague Greece

Goals

Last updated: 17 April 2016
Source: Match reports in Competitive matches  0 shown as blank

Assists

Last updated: 17 April 2016
Source: Match reports in Competitive matches  0 shown as blank

Best goal and MVP awards and nominees

Source: Best of Superleague 2015–2016

Infrastructure leagues

U20

Pos = Position; Pld = Matches played; Pts = Points
Source: Superleague U20

Goals

Last updated: 3 December 2015

U17

Pos = Position; Pld = Matches played; Pts = Points
Source: Superleague U17

U15

Pos = Position; Pld = Matches played; Pts = Points
Source: Superleague U15

References

Veria F.C. seasons
Veria F.C.